Ajith Kumar (born 1 May 1971) is an Indian actor who works predominantly in Tamil cinema. To date, he has starred in over 60 films, and his awards include four Vijay Awards, three Cinema Express Awards, three Filmfare Awards South and three Tamil Nadu State Film Awards. In addition to his acting, Ajith is also a sports car racer and participated in the MRF Racing series (2010). He became a race car driver, competing in circuits around India in places such as Mumbai, Chennai and Delhi. He is one among very few Indians to race in the International arena and in Formula championships. Based on the annual earnings of Indian celebrities, he was included in the Forbes India Celebrity 100 list three times.

He began his career with a small role in the 1990 Tamil romantic drama En Veedu En Kanavar. He established himself as a romantic hero with Kadhal Kottai (1996), Aval Varuvala (1998) and Kaadhal Mannan (1998), and established himself as an action hero starting with the film Amarkalam (1999). Ajith's dual portrayal of twin brothers—where one is deaf-mute—in S. J. Suryah's Vaali (1999) won him his first Filmfare Award for Best Actor – Tamil. He earned critical acclaim for his dual roles in the vigilante film Citizen (2001). In 2006, he starred in Varalaru, in which he played three different roles. It became the highest-grossing Tamil film of 2006, and earned him another Filmfare Award for Best Actor – Tamil. The following year he starred in two remakesKireedam (2007) and Billa (2007), both of which earned him critical acclaim. Ajith played an antihero in Mankatha (2011), which became one of the highest-grossing Tamil films of all time. His next release, Billa II (2012), was Tamil cinema's first prequel.

Ajith has also been abroad for various races, including Germany and Malaysia. He drove in the 2003 Formula Asia BMW Championships. He raced in the 2010 Formula 2 Championship along with two other Indians, Armaan Ebrahim and Parthiva Sureshwaren.

Early life
Ajith Kumar was born on 1 May 1971, His father P. Subramaniam is a Malayali from Palakkad, Kerala and his mother Mohini is Sindhi from Kolkata, West Bengal. Ajith was the middle son out of three brothers, the others being Anup Kumar, an investor, and Anil Kumar, an IIT Madras graduate-turned-entrepreneur.

Ajith dropped out of Asan Memorial Senior Secondary School during his tenth grade, before he had completed his higher secondary schooling. Through a family friend who worked with the Enfield company, Ajith was able to get a job as an apprentice and spent six months training to be a mechanic. He later quit the role at the insistence of his father, who wanted Ajith to have a white-collar job, and joined another family friend's garment exporting company as an apprentice. He eventually progressed to become a business developer and regularly travelled throughout the country on sales assignments, improving his English-speaking skills. After resigning from the role, Ajith set up a textiles business distributing fabric alongside three other partners. The business venture underperformed prompting Ajith to take up another job in the garments industry. During the period, Ajith also began working on modelling assignments alongside his work. He was notably scouted by P. C. Sreeram during the making of a commercial for Hercules Cycle and Motor Company, who felt he had the appearance to become an actor.

Acting career

1990–1998

Ajith began his acting career through a one-scene appearance as a school child in En Veedu En Kanavar (1990). Through the recommendation of S. P. Balasubrahmanyam, whose son was a classmate of Ajith, he was cast in his first lead role in the Telugu romantic drama Prema Pusthakam (1993), which remains his only Telugu film to date. However, the shoot of the film was stalled soon after production began, following the death of the film's director Gollapudi Srinivas. As a result, his first major theatrical release was the Tamil romantic drama Amaravathi (1993), which Ajith had signed after being recommended to director Selva by Balasubrahmanyam, who had seen parts of Prema Pusthakam prior to its delay. As the film went into post-production, Ajith was bed-ridden due to a racing injury while training for an amateur motor race. He underwent three major surgeries resulting in bed rest for one and a half years. As a result, his voice in the film was dubbed by actor Vikram. Following the injury, Ajith was keen to make up for lost time and signed on to play supporting roles. In the following years, he played character roles in the Arvind Swami-starrer Paasamalargal (1994) and Vijay-starrer Rajavin Parvaiyile (1995). He was also seen in the family drama Pavithra (1994), which featured him as an ailing patient shown maternal affection from Raadhika.

Ajith's first commercially successful film as a lead actor was the romantic thriller Aasai (1995). The film, directed by Vasanth and produced by Mani Ratnam featured him in the lead role opposite Suvalakshmi, whose brother-in-law infatuates about her. It performed well at the box office and established Ajith as an upcoming actor in the Tamil film industry. Aasai also earned him his first nomination for the Filmfare Award for Best Actor – Tamil. He later played the lead in Kalloori Vaasal, co-starring Prashanth and Pooja Bhatt. Ajith's second successful film came in the form of National Award winning Kadhal Kottai, in which Ajith reunited with Agathiyan, the director of the earlier project Vaanmathi. The film Kadhal Kottai paired him opposite Devayani, with Heera Rajgopal playing a supporting role.

In 1997, Ajith appeared in five films with none of the projects doing well commercially. During the same period, he had entered into the film distribution business and had experienced losses as a result. Describing the period as a "cruel time", Ajith also continued to have chronic back injuries and several of his other film commitments had become delayed.

Ajith returned in 1998 with another big, successful project in Saran's Kaadhal Mannan, an action romantic comedy, setting the foundation for an expanding fan base. He also began acting in Vasanth's Nerukku Ner, and was later replaced by Suriya. The following films Aval Varuvala and Unnidathil Ennai Koduthen also became successes, with the latter featuring Ajith in a guest role alongside Karthik. Except for Uyirodu Uyiraga, which performed poorly, his other three films released in 1998 were box office hits.

1999–2008

Ramesh Khanna's Thodarum and Sundar C's romantic drama Unnaithedi opposite Malavika set the tone for a series of big successes. S. J. Suryah's thriller Vaali, which portrayed Ajith in dual roles for the first time opposite Simran, became one of his biggest hits at that time. The film told the story of a deaf-mute brother setting his eyes on his younger brother's wife, with Ajith's portrayal of the two brothers winning him his first Filmfare Award for Best Actor – Tamil. Furthermore, Ajith's portrayal of the brothers was also praised, with critics claiming that the film was an "instant classic", with Ajith showing that he is a "talented actor". The two following roles in the drama films Anandha Poongatre and Nee Varuvai Ena also brought Ajith plaudits for his portrayals. His final film before the new millennium was Amarkalam, directed by Saran and featuring Shalini, whom he married shortly after the film. Amarkalam told the story of a neglected child who grew up and failed to show feelings of love or affection, becoming a gangster in the process, with Ajith's depiction of his rogue character appreciated by critics.

His next, Mugavaree, won him commercial and critical praise. The film revolved around the life of a struggling music composer who faces sacrifices to proceed in his career. The film featured dual endings, one with Ajith succeeding in his career, the other with Ajith dejected. Ajith's performance was yet again praised with critics from Rediff, claiming that "Ajith is the real winner", drawing an allusion with the film's script, whilst adding that "it is amazing to see how Ajith has grown as an actor. He brilliantly portrays the vulnerable and sad Sridhar". He also appeared in A. R. Rahman's 2000 musical Kandukondain Kandukondain, directed by Rajiv Menon. The film featured Ajith alongside prominent actor Mammooty and actresses Aishwarya Rai, Tabu and Srividya. In a similar role to his previous film, Ajith played a struggling film director facing an oscillating relationship with Tabu, with the pair being unanimously praised for their roles. After giving six straight hits in 1999, and having had Mugavaree and Kandukondain Kandukondain in 2000 as successes, Ajith had an unsuccessful film, Unnai Kodu Ennai Tharuven, co-starring Simran.

In 2001, Ajith appeared in three commercially successful Tamil films. Dheena co-starring Laila and Suresh Gopi, released at Pongal and marked the beginning of a new image of Ajith as an action hero who would appeal to the masses. He earned the nickname, "Thala" (Leader), from this film. In the same year, he was offered a role in Nandha, which he rejected and was replaced by Suriya, the eldest son of actor Sivakumar. His next was the much-hyped thriller Citizen, portraying him in ten different get-ups and it became a commercial success at the box office. A role in the family drama Poovellam Un Vasam followed opposite Jyothika and was a critical and commercial success, earning him the Tamil Nadu State Film Special Award and his third nomination for the Filmfare Award for Best Actor – Tamil. The year ended off with an appearance in Santosh Sivan's Hindi project Asoka, in which Ajith played as one of the antagonist against Shah Rukh Khan, which did not perform well. In 2002, Ajith appeared in three films, the first two, Red and Raja being box office disappointments, the former further building up his image as an action hero. The third film Villain, directed by K. S. Ravikumar, portrayed Ajith in dual roles, one as a mentally disabled person and another as a caring brother. The film emerged as a commercial successf and earned him his second Filmfare Award for Best Actor – Tamil.

From 2003 through 2005, Ajith appeared in fewer films due to his career in motor racing becoming more prominent. 2003 saw the release of his long-delayed Ennai Thalatta Varuvala and the police drama Anjaneya, both failing commercially. In that period, three successful films, namely Saamy, Kaakha Kaakha and Ghajini, were turned away by the actor due to various reasons.

His next film, Jana with Sneha, also became a big failure, with the Saran film Attagasam, being his only hit in the period. The film saw Ajith portray dual roles, with a song "Thala Deepavali", penned to promote his action image. In 2005, the failure of the Linguswamy film Ji, despite garnering positive reviews and taking a strong opening, saw Ajith take a sabbatical from acting to re-work his image. Of the five films released between 2003 and 2005, his only box office hit was Attagasam.

During 2006, Ajith returned from his hiatus by appearing in P. Vasu's Paramasivan for which he had lost twenty kilograms to portray the lead role. The film enjoyed a moderate success, scoring over Vijay's Aathi, which also released in the same week, at the box office. Critics from The Hindu stated that Ajith looked "trim and taut" in the film with "only his eyes seeming to have lost some of its sparkle", following the major weight loss. Furthermore, for Paramasivan and his two other projects in 2006, Ajith sported long hair, which was being grown for Bala's project Naan Kadavul, which Ajith eventually opted out of. Similarly, his next film, AVM Productions's, Thirupathi, directed by Perarasu performed above average business at the box office, despite garnering poor reviews, with Rediff critics citing that the film is "anything but sensible", but that Ajith "salvages the situation with a spirited performance". Ajith summed up a successful comeback by the release of his long-delayed action drama Varalaru, which went on to become his first biggest success. The K. S. Ravikumar film co-starring Asin, portrayed Ajith in three roles, including that of a classical dancer, with his portrayals being critically praised. Moreover, the film earned Ajith his third Filmfare Award for Best Actor – Tamil. In 2007, media reports hinted that the actor would do a project with Shankar. Ajith's first release in 2007, Aalwar, became a debacle at the box office, with his previous film still continuing to run in theatres even after Aalwar had stopped its brief theatrical run. Kireedam, a remake of the 1989 National Award-winning Malayalam film of the same name, was released to positive reviews, with the film also becoming a moderate success. During the shooting of the film, Ajith developed a further spinal injury, a recurrence of his problem earlier in his career.

Ajith then starred in Billa, a remake of the 1980 Rajinikanth-starrer of the same name. The Vishnuvardhan-directorial fetched critical praise for Ajith, becoming a trend-setter for stylish art direction and cinematography in India. Billa, yet again, featured Ajith in dual roles, one of a notorious don whilst the other played an innocent person who had to act as the don, following the former's death. Billa also earned him his sixth nomination for the Filmfare Award for Best Actor – Tamil. After Billa, Ajith appeared in the film, Ayngaran International's production Aegan, directed by the choreographer turned director Raju Sundaram. The film, a remake of the 2004 Hindi comedy Main Hoon Na, received mixed reviews and was a failure at the box office.

2010–2019

Following a year of production, Ajith's Aasal, released in February 2010, taking a grand opening at the box office. The film, which also featured Ajith in dual roles, also failed at the box office despite bigger expectations.

After a second foray into motor racing, Ajith signed a film directed by Venkat Prabhu, titled Mankatha, which notably became his 50th project. The film featured him in a full-length negative role as Vinayak Mahadevan, a suspended police officer with a lust for money. His performance and his decision to portray a character with negative shade, breaking the stereotype hero image in Tamil cinema, were lauded by critics, with reviewers from Sify and Rediff terming the film as an "out and out Ajith film" that worked "only because of Ajith". Heaping praise on the actor's performance, the former noted that he "rocks as the man with ice in his veins as the mean and diabolic cop" and that he played "the emotionless bad man, to perfection", while the latter wrote that practically "he carried the whole film on his capable shoulders". Mankatha emerged as a commercial success and earned him his seventh nomination for the Filmfare Award for Best Actor – Tamil.

Ajith then starred in Billa II, a sequel to his 2007 film Billa, which released on 13 July 2012. Reviewers appreciated Ajith's on-screen presence and stunts but blamed him for the choice of story and the director. Eventually, the film performed poorly at the box office.
He starred in Vishnuvardhan's Arrambam, alongside Arya, Nayantara and Taapsee Pannu, which was released on 31 October, and earned positive reviews from both critics and audience. Arrambam earned him his eighth nomination for the Filmfare Award for Best Actor – Tamil. His next film was Veeram, directed by Siva and co-starring Tamannaah, which was released on Pongal 2014, which also earned positive reviews from critics. Ajith's next film was Yennai Arindhaal, with Gautham Vasudev Menon as director. Ajith's performance as a cop was widely praised with a critic calling it "Ajith's best since Kandukondain Kandukondain". Both Veeram and Yennai Arindhaal earned him his ninth and tenth nominations for the Filmfare Award for Best Actor – Tamil. Ajith worked with Siva again in Vedalam (2015), in which critics praised his performance. His latest project is Vivegam which received mixed-to-negative reviews with critics citing illogical scenes and average screenplay. His next release, Viswasam, was released on Pongal festival of 2019. Ajith later starred in Nerkonda Paarvai, remake of the Hindi film, Pink (2016), which was released in the same year.

2022-present

In 2022, Ajith collaborated with Vinoth, again, for Valimai. It was written and directed by Vinoth. It released on 24 February to mixed reviews from both the critics and audience, alike. The following year in 2023, they collaborated again for the bank heist thriller, Thunivu. It was produced by Boney Kapoor and it was the third collaboration of the team consisting of Ajith, Boney Kapoor, H. Vinoth, and Nirav Shah. Ghibran composed the music and background score for the film.

Other works

In the late 1990s, Ajith began his own film distribution company called Circuit 9000. In 1998, he announced that he would close the business and refrain from producing, distributing or directing films in the future.

Ajith created the non-profit organisation "Mohini-Mani Foundation", named after his parents, in order to promote self-hygiene and civic consciousness and to help ease the problems of urban sprawl.

In 2004, Ajith was signed as Nescafe's brand ambassador in Tamil Nadu. Later, he has limited his appearance to the silver screen by not appearing or promoting any commercials.
 
Ajith is passionate about UAVs and drones. Recently he has been appointed as the test pilot and UAV system advisor by Madras Institute of Technology for Medical Express-2018 UAV Challenge.

Racing career
Ajith became a racing driver, competing in circuits around India in places such as Mumbai, Chennai and Delhi. He is one among very few Indians to race in the International arena and in Formula championships. He has also been abroad for various races, including Germany and Malaysia. He drove in the 2003 Formula Asia BMW Championships. He raced in the 2010 Formula 2 Championship along with two other Indians, Armaan Ebrahim and Parthiva Sureshwaren.

Formula BMW Asia (2003)
After a one-off race during the Formula Maruti Indian Championships in 2002, where he finished in fourth place, Ajith signed a contract with manager Akbar Ebrahim, confirming his participation in the inaugural Formula BMW Asia championship. Despite spinning out in the first lap of his first race, Ajith successfully completed the season by finishing twelfth.

Formula 2 (2010)

After a six-year sabbatical, Ajith signed up for his third season of car racing by participating in the 2010 season of the FIA Formula Two Championship. The decision to be involved in the sport was made after Ajith's film directed by Gautham Vasudev Menon was delayed, allowing him to participate in the whole season. Prior to signing up, he competed in the final round of the MRF racing series in Chennai in February 2010, but failed to finish the race due to mechanical problems. Further trials in Sepang, Malaysia followed suit as he practised for the season's beginning in April 2010 in his Formula Renault V6 car with Eurasian Racing, shedding 11 kilograms during training.

Personal life

Ajith dated actress Heera Rajagopal in the mid-1990s, but ended the relationship in 1998.

In 1999, during the shoot of Saran's Amarkalam, Ajith started dating his co-star Shalini. At that time, their involvement made them a regular subject of tabloid gossip. Despite the fact actor Ramesh Khanna advised Ajith not to marry an actress, Ajith proposed to actress Shalini in June 1999 and they were married in April 2000 in Chennai. They have two children. Through his marriage to actress Shalini, he became brother-in-law to actor Richard Rishi and actress Shamili, who appeared as his sister-in-law in Rajiv Menon's Kandukondain Kandukondain.

Awards

Notes

References

External links

 

1971 births
Living people
Indian male film actors
Male actors in Tamil cinema
Tamil sportspeople
Filmfare Awards South winners
Tamil Nadu State Film Awards winners
Indian racing drivers
Recipients of the Kalaimamani Award
21st-century Indian male actors
20th-century Indian male actors
Male actors in Hindi cinema
Male actors in Telugu cinema
JK Tyre National Level Racing Championship drivers
Place of birth missing (living people)